Tracy is a city in Lyon County, Minnesota, United States. The population was 2,163 at the 2010 census.

U.S. Route 14 serves as a main arterial route in the community.

Geography

Climate

History
Tracy was platted in 1875. It was named for John F. Tracy, a railroad official. A post office called Tracy has been in operation since 1877. The city was incorporated in 1893.

On June 13, 1968, Tracy was hit by an F5 tornado which killed nine people and injured 150. Until the 1960s, Tracy was a highly active railroad town on the Chicago & Northwestern Railway as a concentration point for numerous branchlines in the area serving heavy agriculture. Today, Tracy holds an annual summer festival called "Boxcar Days," which takes place Labor Day weekend as a sign of the railroad's influence on the town. Currently, Tracy is still a division point on the Canadian Pacific Railway (formerly the Dakota, Minnesota and Eastern Railroad), where railroad crews from both east and west exchange trains.

Demographics

2010 census
As of the census of 2010, there were 2,163 people, 876 households, and 549 families living in the city. The racial makeup of the city was 86.5% White, 0.1% African American, 0.3% Native American, 9.7% Asian, 0.1% Pacific Islander, 1.5% from other races, and 1.7% from two or more races. Hispanic or Latino people of any race were 5.4% of the population.

There were 876 households, of which 30.4% had children under the age of 18 living with them, 48.5% were married couples living together, 9.9% had a female householder with no husband present, 4.2% had a male householder with no wife present, and 37.3% were non-families. 34.7% of all households were made up of individuals, and 18.3% had someone living alone who was 65 years of age or older. The average household size was 2.39 and the average family size was 3.10.

The median age in the city was 38.7 years. 26.4% of residents were under the age of 18; 7.9% were between the ages of 18 and 24; 22.5% were from 25 to 44; 23% were from 45 to 64; and 20.2% were 65 years of age or older. The gender makeup of the city was 48.2% male and 51.8% female.

2000 census
As of the census of 2000, there were 2,268 people, 922 households, and 533 families living in the city. The racial makeup of the city was 87.8% White, 0.3% African American, 0.5% Native American, 8.1% Asian, 0.04% Pacific Islander, 1.7% from other races, and 1.5% from two or more races. Hispanic or Latino people of any race were 2.3% of the population.

There were 922 households, out of which 28.2% had children under the age of 18 living with them, 49.2% were married couples living together, 6.8% had a female householder with no husband present, and 42.1% were non-families. 38.5% of all households were made up of individuals, and 23.2% had someone living alone who was 65 years of age or older. The average household size was 2.35 and the average family size was 3.20.

In the city, the population was spread out, with 27.6% under the age of 18, 6.4% from 18 to 24, 21.2% from 25 to 44, 19.0% from 45 to 64, and 25.9% who were 65 years of age or older. The median age was 41 years. For every 100 females, there were 82.9 males. For every 100 females age 18 and over, there were 75.5 males.

The median income for a household in the city was $31,356, and the median income for a family was $41,108. Males had a median income of $30,221 versus $19,281 for females. The per capita income for the city was $15,574. About 6.6% of families and 13.6% of the population were below the poverty line, including 23.9% of those under age 18 and 10.4% of those age 65 or over.

Notable people
 Curt Brasket, chess player 
 Cal Ludeman, Minnesota state representative
 Dennis Morgan, songwriter
 Will Newton Nelson, Minnesota state representative
 Barbara Vickerman, Minnesota state representative
 Jim Vickerman, Minnesota state senator

References

External links
Official website

Cities in Lyon County, Minnesota
Cities in Minnesota